SSME may refer to:

 NASA Space Transportation System (STS) Space Shuttle Main Engine (SSME)
 Service science, management and engineering (SSME)
 Society for the Study of Medical Ethics (SSME), successor of the London Medical Group
 Sri Lanka School of Military Engineering (SSME)

See also

 SME (disambiguation)
 sesame (disambiguation)

Wikipedia disambiguation